Brandon Ellington (born November 18, 1980) is an American politician who served in the Missouri House of Representatives from 2012 to 2019. His tenure there was reportedly summarized as having focused "on revamping the state's criminal justice system, promoting economic development, and advocating for equal rights" against challenges by the Republican-dominated legislature.

On July 31, 2019 he resigned ahead of his impending term limit, to serve on the Kansas City, Missouri City Council as the Third District at Large Councilmember.  In City Council, he is on the Neighborhood, Planning, and Development Committee and is Vice-Chair of the Special Committee on Housing Policy.

Personal life
Ellington graduated from Paseo High School in 1999, and went to MCC-Penn Valley and the University of Missouri-Kansas City.

He is married to Natasha Ellington and they share three children.  They live in Kansas City, Missouri.

References

1980 births
Living people
Democratic Party members of the Missouri House of Representatives
21st-century American politicians